Rosalie Fish is a Native American runner, member of the Cowlitz Tribe, former student athlete at Iowa Central Community College, currently studying and running for the University of Washington. As a senior at Muckleshoot Tribal School,  Fish made international headlines when she painted a red handprint over her mouth, the fingers extending across her cheeks to honor the lives of missing and murdered indigenous women . Rosalie Fish has also been a featured speaker for Tedx Talks.

Washington State 1B Track and Field Championships - 2019

Murdered and Missing Indigenous Women (MMIW) 
Fish dedicated her performance at the 2019 Washington State 1B track and field championships track meet to murdered and missing indigenous women (MMIW).  At the meet, Fish wore a painted red handprint over her mouth; as well, the letters MMIW written on her leg. Fish was inspired by Jordan Marie Daniel, a citizen of the Kul Wicasa Oyate/Lower Brule Reservation in South Dakota. Daniel first wore a hand print across her face during the Boston Marathon in April 2019.

Results 
Fish placed first in the 800m, 1600m, and 3200m races at the 2019 state championship.

References

External links 

 Rosalie Fish Track & Field Bio
 For the missing and murdered - University of Washington magazine - September 2021

Living people
Native American sportspeople
Native American activists
Missing and Murdered Indigenous Women and Girls movement
Year of birth missing (living people)
Washington Huskies women's track and field athletes
Iowa Central Community College alumni
21st-century Native American women
21st-century Native Americans